Coder is an unincorporated community in Jefferson County, Pennsylvania, United States. It sits at an elevation of 1,276 feet (389 m).

Notable person
Rube Bressler, major-league baseball player, was born in Coder in 1894.

References

Unincorporated communities in Pennsylvania
Unincorporated communities in Jefferson County, Pennsylvania